Maciej H. Wronowicz (fl. 1680s) was a Polish composer, and from 1680–84 capelmeister at  Włocławek.

Surviving works
De profundis for 2 sopranos, bass and basso continuo, a Laudate Dominum for 2 sopranos, bass, 2 violins, viola  b.c., In dulci iubilo for soprano, 2 violins and b.c., a Lauda Sion for soprano, alto, tenor, bass, 2 violins, viola i b.c.

Recordings
Exportatio defuncti, on Damian Stachowicz: Missa pro defunctis, Bornus Consort Dux 2013

References

Year of birth missing
Year of death missing
Polish composers